Vincenzo Crocitti (16 July 1949 – 29 September 2010) was an Italian cinema and television actor. Crocitti was born in Rome. He won a David di Donatello and a Nastro d'Argento for the role of Mario Vivaldi in An Average Little Man.

Selected filmography

Nel sole (1967) - Pupil
Roy Colt & Winchester Jack (1970) - Deaf Man
L'uccello migratore (1972) - Agente Giovanni Nicotera (uncredited)
Torso (1973) - Delivery man
Giovannona Long-Thigh (1973) - Train conductor
El Coronel Buttiglione (1973) - Lieutenant
Rugantino (1973) - Burino
Il colonnello Buttiglione diventa generale (1974)
La sculacciata (1974) - Elena's 'Whoremaster'
Come Home and Meet My Wife (1974) - Tizio Maronati
Il trafficone (1974) - BastianoTaddei
I sette magnifici cornuti (1974)
The "Human" Factor (1975) - Lupo's Driver
Il giustiziere di mezzogiorno (1975) - Trippa
Sexycop (1976) - Meccanico
The Cop in Blue Jeans (1976) - The Stuttering Thief
Amore grande, amore libero (1976)
La ragazza alla pari (1976)
An Average Little Man (1977) - Mario Vivaldi
Melodrammore (1977) - Augusto di Belluogo
Being Twenty (1978) - Riccetto
American Fever (1978)
Midnight Blue (1979) - Mario
La supplente va in città (1979) - Leo Romiti - the son
Polvos mágicos (1979) - Paco
Ciao cialtroni! (1979) - Saro
Tesoro mio (1979)
L'affittacamere (1979) - Patient (uncredited)
Baila guapa (1979)
The Precarious Bank Teller (1980) - Il ragionere Ciuffini
La settimana bianca (1980)
La settimana al mare (1981) - Tito
Aiutami a sognare (1981)
C'è un fantasma nel mio letto (1981) - Camillo Fumagalli, Clerk
Una vacanza del cactus (1981) - Pistilli
Pierino contro tutti (1981) - Uomo morso da una vipera
Chaste and Pure (1981) - 'Picci'
Pierino il fichissimo (1981) - Ernesto
Il sommergibile più pazzo del mondo (1982) - Giovanni Cassiodoro, il Farmacista
Attila flagello di Dio (1982) - Osvaldo
Odd Squad (1983) - Soldato Meniconi
A Proper Scandal (1984) - The JournalistCarabinieri si nasce (1985) - ChefÖdipussi (1988) - Herr ManciniLe finte bionde (1989) - FeliceMagnificat (1993) - AgnelloItalia Village (1994)Uomini sull'orlo di una crisi di nervi (1995) - VincenzoHa-Italkim Ba'im (1996)L'amico di Wang (1997) - Il tassinaro abusivoIl peso dell'aria (2007) - GianfrancoLa vita è una cosa meravigliosa (2010) - Augusto RossettiUna sconfinata giovinezza'' (2010) - Don Nico (final film role)

References

External links
 

1949 births
2010 deaths
Male actors from Rome
Italian male film actors
Italian male television actors
People of Calabrian descent
People of Molisan descent
Burials at the Cimitero Flaminio